Dorothy Khadem-Missagh (born 26 November 1992) is an Austrian pianist.

Life 
Born in Mödling, Khadem-Missagh was born in Austria as the youngest child of a family of musicians and grew up in Baden near Vienna. As a pianist, she continues the musical work of her family in the fourth generation. Her father Bijan Khadem-Missagh is a violinist and conductor. He is the founder and long-time artistic director of the international chamber music festival  and was concertmaster of the Tonkünstler-Orchester Niederösterreich. Her sister Martha and brother Vahid are violinists.

She received her first piano lessons at the age of three, was able to play her first Bach prelude six months later, and was admitted to the University of Music and Performing Arts Vienna when she was only six. She studied there with Noel Flores, Stefan Arnold and Jan Jiracek von Arnim, among others. She received further musical impulses from Martha Argerich and Pavel Gililov as well as at the "Verbier Festival Academy" by András Schiff, Ferenc Rados, Arie Vardi, Robert Levin, Gábor Takács-Nagy and Menahem Pressler.

In 2011, Khadem-Missagh made her debut in the Great Hall of the Vienna Musikvereins with Joseph Haydn's Piano Concerto in D Major. Since then, she has been regularly invited by the Gesellschaft der Musikfreunde in Vienna for solo specials and chamber music concerts at the Vienna Musikverein and the Wiener Konzerthaus. Concert tours have taken her throughout Europe, to Japan and China as well as to the US and Canada.

Awards 
She is the winner of the International Béla Bartók Competition Vienna, finalist of the New York International Piano Competition and has won many awards in other international and national competitions.

References

External links 
 
 Youtube Dorothy Khadem-Missagh live - Ludwig van Beethoven: Sonate Pathétique

Austrian classical pianists
Women classical pianists
1992 births
Living people
People from Mödling